Aleksey Petrovich Pavlov (Moscow, Russian Empire  9 September 1929, Bad Tölz, Bavaria, Germany) was a Russian Imperial geologist and paleontologist, who made a significant contribution in the field of stratigraphy. He was professor at Moscow Imperial University and an academician of the St. Petersburg Imperial Academy of Sciences. He published more than 160 works, especially in the fields of stratigraphy and paleontology.

He was married to Maria Vasilievna (nee Gortynskaya) Pavlova who is noted for her work as a paleontologist and academician. The Museum of Paleontology at Moscow State University is named to honor them jointly for their contributions to the field.

References

1854 births
1929 deaths
Geologists from the Russian Empire
Paleontologists from the Russian Empire
Academic staff of Moscow State University
Academic staff of Tver State University